Mark I or Mark 1 often refers to the first version of a weapon or military vehicle, and is sometimes used in a similar fashion in civilian product development. In some instances, the Arabic numeral "1" is substituted for the Roman numeral "I". "Mark", meaning "model" or "variant", can itself be abbreviated "Mk."

Military and weaponry
Mark I tank (1916), the first tank to be used in combat
Supermarine Spitfire Mk I (1938), Royal Air Force fighter aircraft
Mark I Fire Control Computer, United States Navy fire control computer used in World War II surface ships
Mark I Nuclear Weapon (Little Boy), first nuclear weapon used in combat
The Mark I NAAK, an auto-injector carried by military personnel for use in case of nerve agent attacks
Mk 1 Underwater Defense Gun, 1970s United States Navy dart-shooting underwater firearm
Mk 1 grenade, the first American-designed grenade used by American forces in World War I
Mark I trench knife, a combat knife carried by US forces after World War I
Patrol Boat, River ("Mark I PBR", 1966), 31-foot version of the US Navy riverine patrol boat

Vehicles
Mk I Mini (1959-1967); the original Austin Mini and Morris Mini-Minor from British Motor Corporation
British Railways Mark 1, the first standardised passenger-rated rolling stock (carriages or cars), introduced on British Railways in the 1950s
UTDC ICTS Mark I, rolling stock used by Vancouver SkyTrain rapid transit

Other technologies
MARK 1 or Perceptron (1959-1960), a neural net computer designed by Frank Rosenblatt at Cornell University
Mark I (detector), a particle detector at Stanford Linear Accelerator Center from 1973 to 1977
Colossus Mark I (1944), a British computer used to crack military codes
Ferranti Mark 1 (1951), an early computer based on the Manchester Mark 1
GE BWR Mark I boiling water reactor, a Generation II nuclear reactor
Harvard Mark I (1944), an early automatic digital computer made by IBM
The Lovell Telescope, called the Mark I between 1961 and 1970, then the Mark IA between 1971 and 1987
Manchester Mark 1 (1949), an early Autocode computer
Mesa Boogie Mark I (1969), an electric guitar amplifier designed in Northern California

Other uses
Mark 1 or Mark I, the first chapter of the Gospel of Mark in the New Testament of the Christian Bible
Visual inspection, sometimes been called Mark I Eyeball in the US Military since the 1950s
Patriarch Mark I, retronym for Mark the Apostle as Patriarch of Alexandria
Iron Man's armor

See also
Mark One (disambiguation)